Metamicroptera christophi is a moth of the family Erebidae. It was described by Lukasz Przybylowicz in 2005. It is found in Tanzania and Zambia.

References

Syntomini
Moths described in 2005
Erebid moths of Africa